The Whole Enchilada is the second release by Burrito Deluxe. Following the release of their first album, Tommy Spurlock and Willie Watson departed and the band assembled a touring lineup that added Jeff "Stick" Davis on bass and Garth Hudson of The Band on keyboards.

Track listing 
 "You Got Gold" 4:36
 "The Letter" 2:51
 "Woman Like You" 3:56
 "Sister" 3:19
 "Ezekial's Wheel" 2:33
 "Zydeco Ball" 3:02
 "Everywhere I Go" 3:18
 "All I Had Left (Left With You)" 3:24
 "Memphis Money" 3:44
 "Way Back In The Mountains" 3:15
 "Baton Rouge" 3:00
 "The Last Letter home" 3:59
 "Rex Bob Lowenstein" 7:22
 "Good Night" 3:20

Personnel 
Burrito Deluxe
 Carlton Moody - guitar, mandolin, vocals
 "Sneaky" Pete Kleinow - pedal steel
 Garth Hudson - accordion, Hammond organ, piano, synthesizer
 Jeff "Stick" Davis - bass
 Rick Lonow - drums

Additional personnel
 Jason Lehning - engineer

References 

2004 albums
The Flying Burrito Brothers albums